Jana Obrovská (13 September 1930 – 4 April 1987) was a Czech composer.

Biography
Jana Obrovská was born in Prague, the daughter of painter and sculptor Jakub Obrovský. Her early studies were piano with B. Kabeláčová-Rixová and theory with Jaroslav Řídký. At the Prague Conservatory she studied with M. Krejčí and Emil Hlobil from 1949-55. She won a prize in the 1972 Concours International de Guitarre in Paris for Passocaglia und Toccata. Her Hommage a Béla Bartók  became compulsory in the same Paris competition in 1975. Obrovská also composed music for orchestra and chamber ensembles.

Obrovská married guitar virtuoso Milan Zelenka and the couple had a son, guitarist Vilém Zelenka (b. 1987) who often plays in a duo with his father.

Works
Obrovská's compositions have been recorded and issued on CD, including:

Selective discography
Passacaglia and Toccata for guitar, A. Artzt, Helios CD CDH88026 (1989)
Due Musici and Concerto for Two Guitars and Orchestra, M. Zelenka and L. Brabec with Radio Symphony Orchestra Pilsen, Supraphon VT2789-2 (2018)
Homage to Béla Bartók for guitar, R. Aussel HARMONIA MUNDI CD in MAN4802 (1992)
Four images of Japan for guitar, Tribute to Hiroshige - Homage to Hokusai - Tribute to Utamara - Tribute to Sharaku, R. Aussel HARMONIA MUNDI CD in MAN4802
(1992)
Preludia and Hommage a Choral Gothique for guitar, . . . A Ty Taky Jdi do Ithaky . . . , P. Steidl WILLIAM RECORDING WR001 (2013)

References

1930 births
1987 deaths
20th-century classical composers
Czech classical composers
Musicians from Prague
Prague Conservatory alumni
Women classical composers
20th-century women composers